IBRC can refer to:

 Indiana Business Research Center
 Irish Bank Resolution Corporation
 Insurance Brokers Registration Council, set up under the Insurance Brokers (Registration) Act 1977